Feedback is what occurs when outputs of a system are routed back as inputs as part of a chain of cause-and-effect that forms a circuit or loop.

Feedback may also refer to:

Engineering 
 Feedback control loop, a closed-loop controller
 Audio feedback, the "howl" sometimes heard in microphone or guitar amplification systems
 Video feedback, the optical equivalent of audio feedback, caused when a camera films the image it is producing
 Positive feedback, a feedback system that responds to perturbation in the same direction as the perturbation
 Negative feedback, a method of attenuation to restore equilibrium
 Negative-feedback amplifier, an amplifier designed to stabilize a system and improve performance

Human behaviour
 Corrective feedback, by a parent or teacher to guide a child's learning process
 Delayed Auditory Feedback, a method of combating stuttering
 Employee performance appraisal, particularly methods such as 360-degree feedback

Science
 Biofeedback
 Climate change feedback, for positive and negative feedbacks associated with climate change
 Reinforcement learning from human feedback, a machine learning technique that uses human feedback to directly optimize a model

Mathematics
 Feedback arc set, in graph theory, a method of eliminating directed graphs
 Feedback vertex set, in computational complexity theory, the feedback vertex set problem is a graph-theoretical NP-complete problem

Comics 
 Feedback (Marvel Comics), a Marvel Comics superhero
 Feedback (Dark Horse Comics), the winner of Who Wants to be a Superhero? and a Dark Horse Comics superhero

Music
"Feedback" (Janet Jackson song), 2008
"Feedback" (Kanye West song), 2016
Feedback, a 1944 album by Les Paul
Feedback (Spirit album), 1972
Feedback (EP), a 2004 EP by Rush
Feedback (Jurassic 5 album), 2006
"Feedback", a song by Covenant from their 1996 album Sequencer
Feedback (Derek Webb album), 2010
Feedback (band), a Bangladeshi rock band

Other
 Feedback, a video podcast produced by G4
Feedback (radio series), a BBC Radio Four programme in the UK
Feedback, a character in Ben 10: Omniverse
 Feedback, a design principle in User interface design
 Feedback loop (email)
 Causal loop in the context of time travel or the causal structure of spacetime, that is a sequence of events (actions, information, objects, people)